Sanwal "Atta" Esakhelvi is a British-Pakistani visual effects supervisor, sound designer, singer, musician and songwriter. Before establishing himself as a singer, Esakhelvi was a professional cricketer until 2006 and has worked in British film industry as a VFX artist and sound engineer. He released his first album Teray Khayal Mein (2017) and debuted as a featured artist in the tenth-season of Coke Studio along with his father.

Personal life
Esakhelvi was born to veteran Saraiki singer Attaullah Khan Esakhelvi, while his mother Bazgha Atta was a renowned actress and his sister Laraib Atta is a professional VFX artist who has worked for several Oscar winning Hollywood films. He also has one brother, Bilawal, who is an actor and director based in London, as well as also being a musician. Esakhelvi graduated from City, University of London in sound engineering when an injury made him quit his professional cricket career, "I was always into sports but then an injury forced music to take over."

Discography

Album

Television

Soundtracks

Coke Studio Pakistan

References

External links
 
 Sanwal Esakhelvi at Coke Studio

Living people
Pakistani folk singers
Pakistani male singers
People from Mianwali District
Visual effects artists
Sound designers
Pashtun people
Year of birth missing (living people)